Edward Frederick Dithmar (January 31, 1873 – September 22, 1938) was an American lawyer and politician from Wisconsin. He served as the 23rd Lieutenant Governor of Wisconsin.

Early life
Dithmar was born in Reedsburg, Wisconsin in 1873, the son of Rudolph E. Dithmar and Fredericka (Dargel) Dithmar. He attended Reedsburg Area High School and graduated from the University of Wisconsin in 1894. He studied law and was admitted to the bar in 1899. He began the practice of law in Baraboo.

Political career
He held many political positions in Wisconsin, and began his political career as a messenger in the Wisconsin State Assembly in 1889. Dithmar served as a court clerk in Sauk County from 1894 until 1900, and as register of probate in Baraboo. He was chairman of the Sauk County Republican committee for four years and served as vice-chairman of the Wisconsin State Central Committee during the 1910 campaign. He served as the 23rd Lieutenant Governor of Wisconsin for three terms, from 1915 until 1921, under Governor Emanuel L. Philipp. He ran for the United States Senate in 1925 and for Governor of Wisconsin in 1928; he was unsuccessful in both elections.

He died in 1938 in Baraboo, Wisconsin.

Family life
Dithmar married Emily A. Upham in 1910. They had two children, Edward Upham Dithmar and John Upham Dithmar. They had a third child, Mary Eleanor Dithmar, in 1921.

References

External links
 

	

1873 births
1938 deaths
Lieutenant Governors of Wisconsin
People from Reedsburg, Wisconsin
Wisconsin Republicans
University of Wisconsin–Madison alumni
Wisconsin lawyers